The Final Conflict is a strategy game written by Thomas G. Cleaver for the Apple II and published by Hayden Software in 1982. An Atari 8-bit family version followed in 1983. In The Final Conflict,  the human race has met its demise. What remains are the ruins of dead civilizations and two robot armies, loyal to the whims of their expired human creators.

Reception
Richard Steinberg reviewed The Final Conflict in Space Gamer No. 64. Steinberg commented that "All in all, Final Conflict is a game that should bring you many hours of good, clean war-making. This isn't any easy game; you'll need your thinking cap for this one."

References

External links

1984 Software Encyclopedia from Electronic Games

1982 video games
Apple II games
Atari 8-bit family games
Video games about robots